The Wageningse Berg is the southernmost part of the Utrechse Heuvelrug (Utrecht Hill Ridge), a range of hills reaching an altitude of 52m that originated as a glacial moraine. It lies just north of the Nederrijn and to the east of the town of Wageningen.

It is also the name of a football stadium that was home to the disestablished football club FC Wageningen but has been defunct since 1992

External links
 Unofficial website
 Image gallery of the stadium

FC Wageningen
Defunct football venues in the Netherlands
Sports venues in Gelderland
History of Wageningen